Wrestle Association R held a variety of tournaments competed for wrestlers that were part of their roster during the promotion's existence between 1992 and 2000.

Sporadic tournaments

WAR World Six-Man Tag Team Championship Tournament (1994)

The tournament was held for the newly created WAR World Six-Man Tag Team Championship. The eight-team tournament took place on June 30, 1994.

Six Man Tag Team Tournament

A special six-man tag team tournament was held at the WAR 2nd Anniversary of Revolution on July 17, 1994.

WAR International Junior Heavyweight Championship Tournament

The tournament for the inaugural WAR International Junior Heavyweight Championship was held on March 26, 1995, at the Battle Angel event.

One Night Tag Team Tournament
The One Night Tag Team Tournament was an eight-team tournament held at Super Heavy-War event on December 8, 1995.

Super J-Cup

The second edition of the interpromotional junior heavyweight tournament Super J-Cup was produced by WAR on December 13, 1995.

WAR International Junior Heavyweight Tag Team Championship Tournament (1996)

WAR held a tournament to crown the inaugural WAR International Junior Heavyweight Tag Team Champions on February 23, 1996.

WAR World Six-Man Tag Team Championship Tournament (1996)

A six-man tournament was held at the 4th Anniversary Show on July 20, 1996, to crown the new WAR World Six-Man Tag Team Champions after previous champions Fuyuki-Gun vacated the titles in June.

WAR International Junior Heavyweight Tag Team Championship Tournament (1997)
A tournament was held for the vacant WAR International Junior Heavyweight Tag Team Championship on November 24, 1997, after previous champions Tomohiro Ishii and Yuji Yasuraoka vacated the titles on October 18, 1997.

J-1 Heavyweight Championship Tournament
The tournament was held to crown the new J-1 Heavyweight Championship between November 18, 1997, and January 14, 1998.

Mixed Tag Team Tournament
The Mixed Tag Team Tournament was an interpromotional tag team tournament pitting male and female wrestlers from WAR and LLPW in mixed tag team matches. The tournament took place on September 27, 1998.

See also

Professional wrestling tournament

References

Professional wrestling tournaments
WAR (wrestling promotion)